Parasmani Pradhan (1 January 1898–2 February 1986) was an Indian Nepali-language writer, poet, translator, grammarian, educator and publisher. He published multiple Nepali language textbooks and played an important role in shaping the modern Nepali grammar. He was one of the key figures who contributed in establishing Nepali as one of the official language of India.

He was a part of a literary group in Darjeeling called SuDhaPa with Surya Bikram Gyawali and Dharanidhar Koirala. The trio played an important role in promoting Nepali language among the Nepali diasporic societies in India.

Early life and schooling 
Pradhan was born on 1 January 1898 (18 Poush 1955 BS) in Kalimpong to father Bhagyamani Bhikshacharya and mother Laxmi Maya Newarni. Pradhan's grandfather Chintamani Shakya migrated to Lalitpur district from Okhaldhunga district. His father with his mother then moved to Kashi in India, at the age of 14 where he met the publisher Pt. Harihar Sharma. His father worked with Pt. Harihar Sharma for few years before moving to Kalimpong and settled there. In Kalimpong his father was popularly known as Julfe Newar.

For his primary education, he was admitted to Pudung Primary School, a Scottish missionary school, 2 miles east of his home. Due to the difficulty of the way to the school in monsoon season, he was shifted to Waugh Primary School. He completed his primary education at Waugh. He was then admitted to Upper Primary School of same mission. After he was punished by the teacher at the school, his mother refused to send him back to the school and admitted him in the night school of his uncle Sri Harkadhoj Pradhan. He then went to Darjeeling  with his cousin as a companion, who had won a scholarship to study in a school in Darjeeling. He too was admitted to the Darjeeling Government High School. He passed the Matriculation examination in Hindi medium since Nepali-medium education was not available in Darjeeling and Kalimpong area.

Literary career 
He started his literary career by publishing Adhyavasaya, an article in May 1915 issue of Chandra magazine (Year I, Issue 9) published from Benaras. In the next issue of the same magazine, he wrote an essay titled Bidhya. He played an important role in standardising the Nepali grammar. He published multiple books and text books about the Nepali language grammar.

Between 1918 and 1924, he wrote many plays. He wrote and edited about 45 books in his lifetime including Bharatbarshako Itihas, Bilayat Yatra, Nepali Bhasako Utpati ra Bikas, Kabi ra Kabita, Tipan Tapan, etc. He was a part of group called SooDhaPa alongside Surya Bikram Gyawali and Dharanidhar Koirala. The trio played an important role in promoting Nepali language among the Nepali diasporic society in India. In 1924 they founded a literary organization for Nepalese community in India called ‘Nepali Sahitya Sammelan’, which won the Jagadamba Shree Puraskar, The organization also published a literary magazine called Nepali Sahitya Patrika. The trio christend Laxmi Prasad Devkota, Balkrishna Sama and Lekhnath Paudyal as the trimurti (triumvirate) of Nepali literature.

Personal life and death 
His first wife left him while he was away in Darjeeling for his matriculation exam preparation. He then married Jasmaya Newarni, the daughter of Gopal Singh Malla and Indra Laxmi Malla. They had 12 children. He died on 2 February 1986 in Siliguri.

Notable works

Nepali grammar books/coursebooks

Nepali translation of novels

Plays (written between 1918 and 1924) 

 Sawitri Satyawan
 Sundar Kumar
 Harishchandra
 Ratnawali
 Bidhya Sundar
 Chandra Gupta
 Sita Banbas
 Buddha Charitra Natak
 Mahabharat Natak

Non–fiction 

 Nepal Prathamik Bhugol Vol. I & II (Geographical nonfiction, 1933/46)
 Prathamik Shiksha Bidhi (1942)
 Nepali Hamro Matribhasa (Essay, 1953)
 Nepali Bhasa ko Utapatti ra Bikas (1961)
 Bharat ko Itishas (Ketaketiko) (1961)
 108 Amar Jiwai Vol. I & II (Biographies, 1964)
 Tipan Tapan Vol. I (Essays, 1969)
 Rochak Sanmaran (Essays, 1969)
 Panch Paurakhi Purusha Ratna (Biographies, 1969)
 Nepali Sahitya ko Saun Akshar (Essay, 1969)
 Afno Barema 1 (Autobiography, 1971)
 Kwanti (1972)
 Aathau Anushuchi ma Nepali Bhasa (1972)
 Sarkari Kamkaj Garna Bidhi (1973)
 Kathe Jhanki (Essay, 1974)
 Ramailo Samjhana Kharsang ko (History of Kurseong, 1978)
 Mahakabi Laxmi Prasad Devkota (Biography of Laxmi Prasad Devkota, 1978)
 Kabi Shiromani Lekhnath Paudyal (Biography of Lekhnath Paudyal, 1979)

Short stories 

 Maya ko Chiya
 Katha Bharati Jetho Bhag (1953)
 Katha Bharati Mahilo Bhag (1954)
 Katha Bharati Sahilo Bhag (1955)
 Katha Bharati Kahinlo Bhag (1956)
 Sadhe Saat Katha (1974)

Poems 

 Prasnottar (Bhanubhaktiya) (1949)
 Kabi ra Kabita (1957)
 Jaymala (1972)
 Kathmandu ma Dash Din (1975)

Awards and legacy 
In 1969, he won the Madan Puraskar, Nepal's highest literary honour, for his book Tipan Tapan. The same year, Pradhan was also awarded with the Tribhuvan Puraskar for the book Pancha Paurakhi Purush by Royal Nepal Academy in 1968. He was conferred with the Degree of Doctor of letters (Honoris Causa) by the Tribhuwan University in June 1975 and the Degree of Doctor of Literature (Honoris Causa) by the University of North Bengal in April 1981. In 1983, he was awarded the Ratna Shree Subarna Padak by Ratna Shree Patrika, Kathmandu for his article Maile Chineko Samaj.

His biography titled Dr. Parasmani Ko Jiwan Yatra was written by his son Nagendramani Pradhan. The book won the prestigious Sahitya Akademi award for Nepali language in 1995. An award in his name Parasmani Pradhan Puraskar is awarded annually by Nepali Sahitya Adhyan Samiti.

See also 

 Surya Bikram Gyawali
 Dharanidhar Koirala

References

Further reading 

 

1898 births
1986 deaths
Nepali-language writers
20th-century Nepalese writers
Nepalese male writers
Madan Puraskar winners
Nepali-language poets from India
Nepali-language writers from India
People from Kalimpong district
Newar people
Writers from West Bengal